Husnicioara is a commune located in Mehedinți County, Oltenia, Romania. It is composed of eleven villages: Alunișul, Bădițești, Borogea, Celnata, Dumbrăvița, Husnicioara, Marmanu, Oprănești, Peri, Priboiești and Selișteni.

References

Communes in Mehedinți County
Localities in Oltenia